"Cold" is the first single released by American rock band Crossfade. It was the lead single released from their 2004 debut self-titled album on January 26, 2004. "Cold" reached number 81 on the US Billboard Hot 100, number three on the Billboard Mainstream Rock Tracks chart, and number two on the Billboard Modern Rock Tracks. Worldwide, the song charted in Sweden, reaching number 47 on the Hitlistan chart in May 2005.

Music video
The video was directed by Martin Weisz. It features the band playing in a dark room of a house. A woman (Beau Garrett) walks in the house, standing and admiring the band performing for a while. She then walks up to Ed Sloan, but he continues to play and ignores her. She then walks into his room, falls on his bed, and finds a guitar under his sheets—a possible reference that he played music before the loved person in question. She proceeds to pack some items into a bag and walks back to where the band is playing, towards Sloan.

The woman stands there for a while, then she goes back into the bathroom, with Sloan right behind her. She picks up a picture of the two of them and throws it into the toilet, symbolizing the end of the relationship. She takes a toothbrush and then walks through Sloan, who becomes transparent—making a reference to how he was never really there for her. She goes out of the bathroom, to the door, and stops to look back at the band playing. Sloan looks at her, then looks away. She then leaves the house, presumably for good.

Charts

Release history

References

Crossfade (band) songs
2004 debut singles
2004 songs
Columbia Records singles
Music videos directed by Martin Weisz